Jameson Andrew Blake (born June 17, 1997) is a Filipino American actor, dancer, and model based in the Philippines. He is best known for his roles in the films 2 Cool 2 Be 4gotten (2016), So Connected (2018), and Ang Babaeng Allergic sa WiFi (2018).

Early life
Jameson Andrew Blake was born in Hong Kong on June 17, 1997, to a Filipina mother Clarissa Gibbs and a white American father Robin Blake. He has an older brother and a younger sister. Blake's parents separated, with his father staying in Hong Kong, and he and his siblings moving to the Philippines with his mother.

Career
Blake first appeared in TV Commercials like Bingo Cookie Sandwich, Coca-Cola, and Jollibee.

In 2015 Blake auditioned as a teen housemate for the ABS-CBN Reality TV Show Pinoy Big Brother (aka Pinoy Big Brother: 737). He became part of the second leg of that season, the Regular Edition. Blake entered the house on day 81 and was evicted on day 112.

Later that year, he became part of the all-male dance group Hashtags formed by the noontime variety show It's Showtime.

For his role in the 2016 film 2 Cool 2 Be 4gotten, he was named "Best Supporting Actor" at the 12th Cinema One Originals Film Festival.

Blake has also had roles in Haunted Forest (2017), Mama's Girl (2018), and So Connected (2018).

Filmography

Television

Film

Awards and nominations

Notes

References

External links
 
 

Living people
ABS-CBN personalities
Male actors from Pampanga
Filipino people of American descent
Star Magic
Filipino male television actors
Pinoy Big Brother contestants
Filipino male film actors
1997 births